Du Fengyang (1849–1870), was a Chinese rebel commander.  She was the daughter of Du Wenxiu and served first as a soldier in the army of her father and then as the commander of her own army during the Panthay rebellion in 1867–70.  She was eventually defeated and executed.

References

1847 births
1870 deaths
19th-century Chinese women
19th-century Chinese people
Qing dynasty rebels
Women in 19th-century warfare
19th-century executions by China
Women in war in China
Chinese female military personnel